Marshland Rural District was a rural district in Norfolk, England from 1894 to 1974.

It was formed under the Local Government Act 1894 based on the Marshland rural sanitary district, and was named after the Freebridge Marshland hundred.  It covered an area to the west of King's Lynn on the borders of Lincolnshire and the Isle of Ely.

In 1930 a new parish of Nordelph was created in Downham RD, taking land mostly out of the Marshland RD parishes of Upwell and Outwell.

During the period 1933-1935 it absorbed most of the area of the disbanded Walsoken Urban District, with other minor boundary changes.

In 1974, the district was abolished under the Local Government Act 1972, and became part of the West Norfolk district.

Statistics

Parishes

References

Districts of England created by the Local Government Act 1894
Districts of England abolished by the Local Government Act 1972
Historical districts of Norfolk
Rural districts of England